Vinohrady Theatre is a theatre in Vinohrady, Prague.

Construction began on February 27, 1905. It served as the Theatre of the Czechoslovak Army from autumn 1950 to January 1966. It contains a curtain painted by Vladimír Županský depicting a naked muse.

Playwrights associated with the theatre include Viktor Dyk who was active around 1915.

During the Velvet Revolution, where the Czechoslovak Socialist Republic was overthrown, there was a rally outside the theatre on the night of November 19–20; actress Vlasta Chramostová was quoted as asking the crowd: "If not now, when? If not us, then who?"

References

Theatres in Prague
Art Nouveau architecture in Prague
1907 establishments in Austria-Hungary
Theatres completed in 1907